
Money-rich, time-poor, is an expression used to describe groups of people who have relatively little leisure time despite having a high disposable income through well-paid employment. Time poverty has also been coined as a noun for the phenomenon.

Marketing researchers Kenhove and De Wulf have suggested that grocery-shoppers can be divided into four segments: 'money-poor, time-rich', 'money-poor, time-poor', 'money-rich, time-rich' and 'money-rich, time-poor'. Their analysis suggests that these groups have significant differences in behaviour and attitudes which impact their buying habits.

See also
 Affluenza
 Eight-hour day
 Four-day week
 Six-hour day
 Slow movement (culture)
 Time affluence
 Work–life balance
 Workaholic

References

External links 
 GatesNotes 2016 Annual Letter

Personal life
Working time
Work–life balance
Employment
Emotional issues